Bakaye Traoré (born 6 March 1985) is a former professional footballer who played as a central midfielder for Amiens SC and AS Nancy in France, for A.C. Milan in Italy, and for Kayseri Erciyesspor and Bursaspor in Turkey. Born in France, he was capped 24 times at international level by Mali national team scoring twice.

Club career

Amiens and Nancy
On 10 June 2009, Traoré left Amiens SC to sign a three-year deal with AS Nancy.

Milan
On 17 May 2012, Traoré signed a three-year contract with A.C. Milan. On 26 September 2012, he made his first appearance in Milan's 2–0 win against Cagliari in Serie A. He made seven first team appearances in his first season at Milan, all of them off the bench.

Kayseri Erciyesspor
On 5 September 2013, Traoré was sent on loan to Turkish Süper Lig club Kayseri Erciyesspor.

Bursaspor
After his contract has ended with Milan, he signed a contract for three years with Bursaspor.

International career
Traoré was a member of the Mali national team and played his debut on 24 February 2009 against Angola.

Career statistics

Club

International

Honours
Mali
Africa Cup of Nations bronze: 2012

References

External links

 

1985 births
Living people
Sportspeople from Bondy
French people of Malian descent
French footballers
Malian footballers
Malian expatriate footballers
Mali international footballers
Association football midfielders
Amiens SC players
AS Nancy Lorraine players
A.C. Milan players
Bursaspor footballers
Ligue 1 players
Ligue 2 players
Serie A players
Süper Lig players
2010 Africa Cup of Nations players
2012 Africa Cup of Nations players
Expatriate footballers in Italy
Expatriate footballers in Turkey
Footballers from Seine-Saint-Denis